Sékou Baradji or Sekou Baradji may refer to:

Sekou Baradji (footballer, born 1984), French football midfielder
Sékou Baradji (footballer, born 1995), French football forward